Securicula gora is a species of cyprinid fish found in Bangladesh, India, Pakistan and possibly in Nepal.  It is the only species in its genus.

Description
'Sericula gora is a silvery fish with an upward pointing mouth, which has a prominent cartilagenous knob on the lower jaw, and a keel running along the abdomen from below the pectoral fin to the anal fin. The dorsal fin has its origin in front of that of the anal fin. The caudal fin has its lower lobe longer than the upper lobe and the pelvic fins has well developed axillary scales. There are 140-160 scales in the lateral line which is complete and decurved. It grows to a maximum length of 24.5cm.

Distribution
Securicula gora is known to occur in the Ganges and Brahmaputra drainages of India, Bangladesh and Nepal. The presence of this species in the Punjab in India and Pakistan has not been confirmed.

Habitat and ecology
Securicula gora is a pelagic, freshwater species which can be found in rivers, beels and canals. It is a predatory species which feeds on insects, insect larvae and crustaceans which it takes at or near the surface of the water. In 1988 a new species of monogenean parasite, Heteromazocraes mamaevi was described from specimens of S. gora sampled near Lucknow, until then this genus of parasites had been thought only to occur on members of the Clupeid family Engraulidae.

Conservation and Human use
Securicula gora is a common and widespread species where it occurs and is thus treated as Least Concern by the IUCN but its habitat can be affected by silting caused by logging and consequent deforestation of the land surrounding the waters it inhabits.

This species is consumed as food in Bangladesh and other parts of it range where it is normally of minor interest to commercial fisheries,
 except in parts of India where it is commercially fished for.

References

Danios
Monotypic ray-finned fish genera
Fish of Asia
Fish of India
Fish of Pakistan
Fish of Bangladesh
Taxa named by Albert Günther